"We Need a Little Christmas" is a popular Christmas song originating from Jerry Herman's Broadway musical Mame, and first performed by Angela Lansbury in that 1966 production.

In the musical, the song is performed after Mame has lost her fortune in the Wall Street Crash of 1929, and decides that she, her young nephew Patrick, and her two household servants "need a little Christmas now" to cheer them up. The original lyrics include the line, "But, Auntie Mame, it's one week past Thanksgiving Day now!"  Since the time the song was written the phenomenon of Christmas creep has resulted in the normal holiday season beginning much earlier than it once did.

Notable recordings
 Percy Faith with His Orchestra and Chorus (1966) (Christmas Is... Percy Faith)
 Skitch Henderson & The Tonight Show Orchestra (1966) (Broadway Tonight! Skitch Henderson & The Tonight Show Orchestra Play Music From "Mame")
 Johnny Mathis (1986) (Christmas Eve with Johnny Mathis)
 The Muppets (1987) (A Muppet Family Christmas)
 Bugs Bunny & Friends with Daffy Duck (1994) (Have Yourself a Looney Tunes Christmas)
 Andy Williams (1995) (We Need a Little Christmas)
 Mormon Tabernacle Choir with Angela Lansbury (2001) (later appeared on the choir's 2006 album, The Wonder of Christmas)
Andrea McArdle (2006) (Andrea McArdle's Family Christmas)
 Legacy Five (2007) (Little Christmas)
 Kimberly Locke (2007) (Christmas)
 Glee Cast (2010) (Glee: The Music, The Christmas Album and episode A Very Glee Christmas) 
 Ages and Ages (2012) (Holidays Rule)
 Idina Menzel (2019) (Christmas: A Season of Love)
Pentatonix (2020) (We Need a Little Christmas)
 Kelly Rowland (2020) (We Need a Little Christmas)

Charts

Kimberley Locke version

Glee Cast version

Pentatonix version

References 

1966 songs
American Christmas songs
Percy Faith songs
Johnny Mathis songs
Kimberley Locke songs
Songs from musicals
Songs written by Jerry Herman